Pham Hoang Hiep  is a Vietnamese Mathematician known for his work in complex analysis. He is a professor at the  Vietnam Academy of Science and Technology and director of the International Centre for Mathematical Research and Training. He was awarded the 2015 Prof. Ta Quang Buu prize (young prize) and the 2019 ICTP Ramanujan Prize.

Research and career 

Pham Hoang Hiep  graduated from Hanoi National University of Education in 2004 and obtained his PhD  at Umea University in 2008. He obtained a doctorate in science at Aix-Marseille University in  2013.  He is known for being the youngest full professor in Vietnam. He is on the editorial board of Acta Mathematica Vietnamica

Pham has worked on plurisubharmonic functions and (with Jean-Pierre Demailly) found a lower-bound on the log canonical threshold of such a function. If  is such a function then  Pham and Demailly found a sharp inequality on the largest constant, c, so that  is integrable in the neighbourhood of a singularity.

Awards and honours 

 2015  Ta Quang Buu Prize   for his paper on "A sharp lower bound for the log canonical threshold" (2014)
 2019 ICTP-Ramanujan Prize for "outstanding contributions to the field of complex analysis, and in particular to pluripotential theory".
 2020 Asian scientist 100

Selected publications

References 

Vietnamese mathematicians
Hanoi National University of Education
Year of birth missing (living people)
Living people